Euthria philpoppei is a species of sea snail, a marine gastropod mollusk in the family Buccinidae, the true whelks.

Description
The length of the shell attains 22.8 mm.

Distribution
This marine species occurs off New Caledonia.

References

 Fraussen K. 2002. A new Euthria (Gastropoda, Buccinidae) from New Caledonia. Gloria Maris 41(4-5): 70-75
 Bouchet, P.; Fontaine, B. (2009). List of new marine species described between 2002-2006. Census of Marine Life

External links

Buccinidae
Gastropods described in 2002